Manaris is a village in Arcadia, Greece. It is part of the municipal unit Valtetsi and has 15 permanent residents. It is situated at the southeastern end of the plain of Asea.

Populated places in Arcadia, Peloponnese